The 1988 Soul Train Music Awards were held on March 30, 1988, at the Santa Monica Civic Auditorium in Los Angeles, California. The show was broadcast live in select cities and aired later in other areas. Dionne Warwick hosted.

Special Award

Heritage Award
 Gladys Knight & the Pips

Winners and nominees
Winners are in bold text.

Album of the Year – Male
 Michael Jackson – Bad
 Alexander O'Neal – Hearsay
 Prince – Sign o' the Times
 Stevie Wonder – Characters

Album of the Year – Female
 Whitney Houston – Whitney
 Natalie Cole – Everlasting
 Jody Watley – Jody Watley
 Angela Winbush – Sharp

Album of the Year – Group or Band
 LeVert – The Big Throwdown
 Earth, Wind & Fire – Touch the World
 Gladys Knight & the Pips – All Our Love
 The Whispers – Just Gets Better with Time

Best Single – Male
 Michael Jackson – "Bad"
 Prince – "U Got the Look"
 Luther Vandross – "So Amazing"
 Stevie Wonder – "Skeletons"

Best Single – Female
 Natalie Cole – "I Live for Your Love"
 Janet Jackson – "The Pleasure Principle"
 Jody Watley – "Looking for a New Love"
 Angela Winbush – "Angel"

Best Single – Group or Band
 LeVert – "Casanova"
 Atlantic Starr – "Always"
 Earth, Wind & Fire – "System of Survival"
 The Whispers – "Rock Steady"

Best Rap Single
 LL Cool J – "I Need Love"
 Dana Dane – "Cinderfella Dana Dane"
 The Fat Boys – "Wipeout"
 Kool Moe Dee – "How Ya Like Me Now"

Best Music Video
 Janet Jackson – "Control"
 Whitney Houston – "I Wanna Dance with Somebody (Who Loves Me)"
 Michael Jackson – "The Way You Make Me Feel"
 Jody Watley – "Looking for a New Love"

Best New Artist
 Miki Howard
 Terence Trent D'Arby
 Exposé
 Shanice Wilson

Best Rap Album
 LL Cool J – Bigger and Deffer
 Eric B. & Rakim – Paid in Full
 Heavy D & the Boyz – Living Large
 Whodini – Open Sesame

Best Gospel Album – Solo
 Vanessa Bell Armstrong – Following Jesus
 Shirley Caesar – Her Very Best
 Aretha Franklin – One Lord, One Faith, One Baptism
 Al Green – Soul Survivor

Best Gospel Album – Group or Choir
 The Winans – Decisions
 Reverend Milton Brunson and The Thompson Community Singers – If I Be Lifted
 Commissioned – Go Tell Somebody
 The Clark Sisters – Heart and Soul

Best Jazz Album – Solo
 Najee – Najee's Theme
 Jonathan Butler – Jonathan Butler
 Dexter Gordon – The Other Side of Round Midnight
 David Sanborn – A Change of Heart

Best Jazz Album – Group or Band
 Hiroshima – Go
 George Benson and Earl Klugh – Collaboration
 Freddie Hubbard – Life Flight
 Pat Metheny Group – Still Life (Talking)

Performers
 Alexander O'Neal
 Natalie Cole
 Kool Moe Dee
 The Whispers
 Smokey Robinson
 LL Cool J
 Hiroshima and George Duke
 Gladys Knight & the Pips Tribute:
 Chaka Khan
 Stephanie Mills
 Angela Winbush
 Ronald Isley
 Dionne Warwick and Howard Hewett
 Patti LaBelle and the Edwin Hawkins Singers
 Gladys Knight & the Pips

References

Soul Train Music Awards
Soul
Soul
Soul Train
1988 in Los Angeles